Acacia sibina is a tree or shrub belonging to the genus Acacia and the subgenus Juliflorae the is endemic to parts of western Australia.

Description
It has glabrous branchlets that are tomentulose in axils where the phyllodes are found. The erect, terete and evergreen phyllodes are straight to slightly curved. They have a pungent odour and are indistinctly striate. It blooms from August to October producing yellow flowers. The simple inflorescences are found in pairs in the axils. After flowering firmly chartaceous linear shaped seed pods form that are raised over and constricted between each of the seeds. The glossy dark brown seeds are arranged longitudinally within the pods.

Taxonomy
It was first described in 1977 by Bruce Maslin.

Distribution
A. sibina is native to a large area in the Mid West, Goldfields and Wheatbelt region of Western Australia where it is often situated on flats, sand plains and rocky hills growing in gravelly, yellow or red sandy soils or loamy soils over laterite.

See also
List of Acacia species

References

sibina
Acacias of Western Australia
Taxa named by Bruce Maslin
Plants described in 1977